Acleris indignana is a species of moth of the family Tortricidae. It is found in the Russian Far East (Ussuri) and Japan.

The wingspan is 16–18 mm.

The larvae feed on Malus baccata.

References

Moths described in 1881
indignana
Moths of Asia
Moths of Japan